Córdoba most commonly refers to:
 Córdoba, Spain, a major city in southern Spain and formerly the imperial capital of Islamic Spain
 Córdoba, Argentina, second largest city in Argentina and capital of Córdoba Province

Córdoba or Cordoba may also refer to:

Places

Argentina
 Córdoba Province, Argentina

Colombia
 Córdoba Department
 Córdoba, Quindío
 Córdoba, Bolívar
 Córdoba, Nariño
 Córdoba (wetland), a wetland of Bogota

Mexico
 Córdoba, Veracruz

Spain
 Province of Córdoba (Spain), of which Córdoba is the capital of
 Córdoba (Spanish Congress electoral district), the electoral district representing the province
 Córdoba (Vino de la Tierra), a wine-producing region in Spain
Kingdom of Córdoba, historical territorial jurisdiction of the Crown of Castile

Historical Islamic states
 Emirate of Córdoba, 756–929
 Caliphate of Córdoba, 929–1031
 Taifa of Córdoba, 11th century

Venezuela
 Córdoba Municipality, Táchira, a municipality of Táchira State, Venezuela

Cars
 Chrysler Cordoba
 SEAT Córdoba

Ships 

 MSC Cordoba, a 2008 Liberia registered container vessel operated by MSC
 SS N. Y. U. Victory, a Victory class ship, converted in 1947 for civilian use and renamed Cordoba

Sports organisations 

Bball Córdoba, Basketball team based in Córdoba, Andalusia
Córdoba CF, a Spanish football club
RCD Córdoba, defunct Spanish football team from Córdoba, Andalusia
Córdoba F.C., a defunct Colombian football team, from Montería, Córdoba, Colombia

Treaties 

Cordoba Agreement, 2006, an agreement between the Governments of Spain, the United Kingdom and Gibraltar
Treaty of Córdoba, establishing Mexican independence from Spain in 1821

People with the surname

Culture 

Marcelo Córdoba (born 1973), Argentine actor
Pedro de Cordoba (1881–1950), American actor
Ximena Córdoba (born 1979), Colombian model and actress

Military and politics 

Francisco Hernández de Córdoba (Yucatán conquistador) (died 1517)
Francisco Hernández de Córdoba (founder of Nicaragua) (died 1526)
Gonzalo Fernández de Córdoba (1453–1515), Spanish military leader
Gonzalo Fernández de Córdoba (1585–1645), Spanish military leader
Hisham III of Córdoba (1026–1031), the last Caliph of Córdoba
Jaime Córdoba (politician) (born 1950), Curaçaoan politician
José María Córdoba (1799–1829), general of the Colombian army during the Latin American War of independence
Piedad Córdoba (born 1955), Colombian senator
Subh of Cordoba (circa 940 – circa 999), regent of the Caliphate of Córdoba

Religion 

 Eulogius of Córdoba (died 857), Spanish bishop, one of the Martyrs of Córdoba
 Pelagius of Córdoba (c. 912–926), Christian boy and saint who died as a martyr in Cordoba

Sports 

Alberto Cordoba (1925-2019), Mexican footballer
Allen Córdoba (born 1995), Panamanian baseball infielder
Carlos Córdoba (born 1958), Argentine football coach and former player
César Córdoba (born 1980), Spanish professional kickboxer and boxer
Fernando Gastón Córdoba (born 1974), Argentine football midfielder
Hernan Córdoba (1989–2009), Colombian footballer
Iñigo Córdoba (born 1997), Spanish footballer
Iván Córdoba (born 1976), Colombian footballer
Jaime Córdoba (born 1988), Colombian footballer
Jhon Córdoba (born 1993), Colombian footballer
John Córdoba (born 1987) Colombian footballer
Nicolás Córdoba (born 1989), Argentine artistic gymnast
Óscar Córdoba (born 1970), Colombian football goalkeeper
Ricardo Cordoba, (born 1983), Panamanian boxer
Víctor Córdoba (born 1962), Panamanian super middleweight boxer

Other uses 
University of Cordoba (disambiguation), several educational facilities throughout the world
Córdoba (Albéniz), a musical composition by Isaac Albéniz
Nicaraguan córdoba, the currency of Nicaragua
Cordoba Fighting Dog, an extinct breed of fighting dog
Cordoba Initiative, a multi-national, multi-faith organization dedicated to improving Muslim-West relations
Park51, real estate and community center in Manhattan, New York, originally named Cordoba House

See also

 Cordoba House, a planned Islamic community center in Lower Manhattan, US
 Cordoba Foundation, a UK-based research and advisory group
 365 Corduba, an asteroid
 Cordova (disambiguation)